Roman Konečný (born 25 July 1983) is a Slovak football defender who currently plays for FK Hodonin.

Club career
Born in Holíč, Konečný began playing football with local side FC Spartak Trnava. In January 2010, he would move abroad to play in the Greek second division with Thrasyvoulos F.C. He spent six months with the Greek club before returning to the Slovak league with DAC Dunajská Streda.

International career
Konečný played for Slovakia at the 2003 FIFA World Youth Championship in the United Arab Emirates.

Honours

Slovakia
Slovakia U20
2003 FIFA U-20 World Cup: Participation 
Slovakia U19
 2002 UEFA European Under-19 Football Championship - Third place

References

3.Pavol Drábek Roman Konečný exkluzívne pre Šport7.sk pre Šport7.sk

External links
Profile at epae.org

1983 births
Living people
Slovak footballers
Slovakia youth international footballers
Slovak expatriate footballers
Slovak Super Liga players
Football League (Greece) players
FC Spartak Trnava players
FC Senec players
FC Petržalka players
FC DAC 1904 Dunajská Streda players
ŠK Slovan Bratislava players
Thrasyvoulos F.C. players
MFK Skalica players
Expatriate footballers in Greece
People from Skalica District
Sportspeople from the Trnava Region
Association football central defenders